The FL6 (until 2012 FR6) is a regional rail route.  It forms part of the network of the Lazio regional railways, which is operated by Trenitalia, and converges on the city of Rome, Italy.

The route operates over the infrastructure of the Rome–Cassino–Naples railway.  Within the territory of the comune of Rome, it plays the role of a commuter railway. It is estimated that on average about 50,000 passengers travel on an FL6 train each day.

The designation FL6 appears only in publicity material (e.g. public transport maps), in the official timetables, and on signs at some stations.  The electronic destination boards at stations on the FL6 route show only the designation "R" and the relevant train number.

Route 

  Roma Termini ↔ Cassino

The FL6, a radial route, runs from Roma Termini, on the southern perimeter of Rome's city centre, in a south easterly direction, via the Rome–Cassino–Naples railway, to Cassino.

Stations 
The stations on the FL6 are as follows:
 Roma Termini        
 Capannelle 
 Ciampino 
 Tor Vergata
 Colle Mattia
 Colonna Galleria
 Zagarolo
 Labico
 Valmontone
 Colleferro-Segni-Paliano
 Anagni-Fiuggi
 Sgurgola
 Morolo
 Ferentino-Supino
 Frosinone
 Ceccano
 Castro-Pofi-Vallecorsa
 Ceprano-Falvaterra
 Isoletta-San Giovanni Incarico
 Roccasecca
 Piedimonte-Villa Santa Lucia-Aquino
 Cassino

Scheduling 
The FL6 route is included in the Trenitalia official timetable M80 Roma–Cassino–Caserta–Napoli.

, FL6 services operated between Roma Termini and Cassino on a clock-face schedule once every hour in each direction.

See also 

 History of rail transport in Italy
 List of railway stations in Lazio
 Rail transport in Italy
 Transport in Rome

References

External links
 ATAC – official site 
 ATAC map – schematic depicting all routes in the Rome railway network

This article is based upon a translation of the Italian language version as at November 2012.

Ferrovie regionali del Lazio